Romero Duno (born 14 October 1995) is a Filipino professional boxer. He is the current WBA Asia lightweight champion after defeating Kuldeep Dhanda of India on February 9, 2019.

Professional career

Duno turned professional 2014 and in 2017 he stopped Christian Gonzalez of USA for the vacant WBC Youth Intercontinental lightweight title. Later after the fight, he was signed by Oscar De La Hoya's Golden Boy Promotions.<ref><kuldeep patel

Professional boxing record

References

External links

1995 births
Living people
Filipino male boxers
People from Cotabato City
Lightweight boxers